Kihnu is an island in the Baltic Sea. With an area of  it is the largest island in the Gulf of Riga and the seventh largest island of Estonia.

The island belongs to the Pärnu County of Estonia.

604 people live on Kihnu , 69 of whom are primary school pupils. There are four villages: Lemsi, Linaküla, Rootsiküla and Sääre. One can reach Kihnu by a 15-minute plane trip from Pärnu or by ferry, with trips taking 3 hours from Pärnu and 1 hour from Manilaid. When the sea is frozen in winter, it is possible to drive to the island over the ice.

The nearby isle of Manilaid (or Manija, Manõja in the Kihnu dialect) was inhabited by people from Kihnu since 1933 and thus shares its culture.

UNESCO proclaimed Kihnu's cultural space and traditions as a Masterpiece of the Oral and Intangible Heritage of Humanity on November 7, 2003.

Kihnu is also called Kihnumua (e.g. "Kihnuland") in the local dialect. Names in other languages include Ķīļu in Latvian, Kynö in Standard Swedish, Kin in Estonian Swedish, and historically Kühnö in German. In Estonian Sign Language, the island is signed by imitating the vertical stripes of a Kihnu skirt. There are various theories on the etymology of the name Kihnu, with no consensus. The earliest recorded version of the island's name is Kyne, from 1386.

Culture

As the men of Kihnu have been frequently away to sea, women have run everyday life on the island and became the guardians of the island's cultural heritage, which includes handicrafts, dances, games and music. Music is an especially important part of the island's traditions, and accompanies handicrafts, religious feasts and other celebrations. Ancient runo-styled songs are also important, as is traditional clothing adorned with decorations and bright colours. There are elaborate wedding traditions, which are considered the "most complex and bright expression" of Kihnu culture.

Kihnu is famous for its handicrafts and distinctive traditional clothing, which is still commonly worn today. It includes striped skirts (kört), and patterned knit men's sweaters (troi), and knit mittens. Young women have traditionally organised evening get-togethers (ülalistmine, i.e. "sitting (staying) up (late)") to do handicrafts.

Traditional cuisine includes rye bread with potatoes, pork fat or Baltic herring added to the dough; eel soup, prepared by fishermen; and sweet milk soup, an important dish in weddings. Seal hunting is practiced in Kihnu, and their meat is considered a delicacy. Another distinctive delicacy is the eggs of semi-domesticated mergansers (waterbirds), also used for baking cakes.

In the 19th and early 20th century, numerous men from Kihnu became sailors. The most famous of them was the largely self-taught captain Enn Uuetoa, also known as Kihnu Jõnn (1848 – 1913; Jõnn is the local pronunciation of the name Enn).

Language
The Kihnu dialect is considered to belong to the insular dialect group of North Estonian, along with the dialects of Saaremaa, Muhu and Hiiumaa. It is unusual among North Estonian dialects in preserving vowel harmony, like most other Finnic languages. The dialect includes triphthongs. There are Swedish influences in vocabulary and intonation.

Geography and climate
The island has a sandy interior and a rocky coast made up of more than fifty islets which make up an important nesting ground for birds. Along the dunes, beach ridges and sands of the eastern part the island reaches its maximum height of 29.6 m above sea level.

Images of Kihnu

See also
List of islands of Estonia

References

External links

Kihnu cultural space
360-Degree Aerial Panorama of Kihnu

Kihnu Parish
Estonian islands in the Baltic
Landforms of Pärnu County
Masterpieces of the Oral and Intangible Heritage of Humanity